A hop is a type of jump.

Hop or hops may also refer to:

Arts and entertainment
 Hop (film), a 2011 film
 Hop! Channel, an Israeli TV channel
 House of Payne, or HOP, an American sitcom
 Lindy Hop, a swing dance of the 1920s and 1930s
 Sock hop, an informal gathering which includes dancing
 Hop Harrigan, a character in American comic books, radio serials and film serials from 1939 into the 1940s
 Hop, a character from Pokémon Sword and Shield

People
 Hop Bartlett, American baseball pitcher in the Negro leagues in 1924 and 1925
 Hop Wilson (1921–1975), American Texas blues steel guitar player

Places
 Hop River, Connecticut, United States
 Hop Creek, South Dakota, United States
 Hóp (Iceland), a lake
 Hóp, a Viking settlement in Vinland

Plants
 Humulus lupulus, the hop plant
 Hops, its flower, used to prepare beer and other food

Science and medicine 
 HOP (gene), encoding the homeodomain-only protein
 Hop (protein), the Hsp70-Hsp90 organizing protein
 Hubble Origins Probe, or HOP, a proposed orbital telescope

Technology
 Hop (networking), a portion of a route 
 Hop (software), a web broker and programming language
 Hop (telecommunications)
 Hindsight optimization, or Hop, an artificial intelligence technique
 High Octet Preset, or HOP, a C1 control character
 Spike (application), an email app formerly known as Hop

Transport
 Air France Hop, a French airline
 HOP card, a smart card used on public transit in Auckland, New Zealand
 Heritage Operations Processing System, a tool for management of historic railways
 Hope railway station (England), in England
 Hope station (Arkansas), in Arkansas, United States
 "The Hop", the brand for public transport in Sydney and New South Wales
 "The Hop (streetcar)", streetcar system in Milwaukee

Other uses
 Hop (unit), a small Korean unit of volume
 Croatian Liberation Movement
 Heritage of Pride, or HOP, the organizer of the annual gay pride march in New York City
 Higher-Order Perl, or HOP, a Perl programming book
 Hillsboro Hops, a minor league baseball team in the USA
 Slang for Opium, heroin, or other narcotic or psychoactive drugs

See also
 Hopper (disambiguation)
 Hopping (disambiguation)
 Hopps
 Hip hop

Lists of people by nickname